The Emirate of Abu Dhabi (or ;) is one of seven emirates that constitute the United Arab Emirates (UAE). It is by far the largest emirate, accounting for 87% of the nation's total land area or 67,340 km2 (or 26,000 sq mi). Abu Dhabi also has the second-largest population of the seven emirates. In June 2011 this was estimated to be 2,120,700 people, of which 439,100 people (less than 21%) were Emirati citizens. The city of Abu Dhabi, after which the emirate is named, is the capital of both the emirate and federation.

In the early 1970s, two important developments influenced the status of the Emirate of Abu Dhabi. The first was the establishment of the United Arab Emirates in December 1971, with Abu Dhabi as its political and administrative capital. The second was the sharp increase in oil prices following the October 1973 War, which accompanied a change in the relationship between the oil countries and foreign oil companies, leading to a dramatic rise in oil revenues. Abu Dhabi's Gross Domestic Product (GDP) estimates, in 2014, amounted to (EUR 0.24 tril.) AED 960 billion at current prices. Mining and quarrying (includes crude oil and natural gas) account for the largest contribution to GDP (58.5 per cent in 2011). Construction-related industries are the next largest contributor (10.1 per cent in 2011). GDP grew to AED 911.6 billion in 2012, or over US$100,000 per capita. In recent times, the Emirate of Abu Dhabi has continuously contributed around 60 per cent of the GDP of the United Arab Emirates, while its population constitutes only 34 per cent of the total UAE population according to the 2005 census.

Etymology
Before the area got the name Abu Dhabi, it was known as Milh, which means salt in Arabic, probably because of the salt water in the area. Milh is still the name of one of the islands in Abu Dhabi.

"Dhabi" is the Arabic name of a particular species of native gazelle that was once common in the Arabian region. Abu Dhabi means the father of "Dhabi" (gazelle). The first use of the name goes back over 300 years. Since the origin of this name has been passed down from generation to generation through poems and legends, it is difficult to know the actual etymology of the name. It is thought that the name came about because of the abundance of gazelles in the area, and a popular folk tale about the founding of the city of Abu Dhabi involving Sheikh Shakhbut bin Dhiyab al Nahyan.

History

Parts of Abu Dhabi were settled millennia ago, and its early history fits the nomadic herding and fishing pattern typical of the broader region. The Emirate shares the historical region of Al-Buraimi or Tawam (which includes modern-day Al Ain) with Oman, and is demonstrated to have been inhabited for over 7000 years. Modern Abu Dhabi traces its origins to the rise of an important tribal confederation, the Bani Yas, in the late 18th century, which also assumed control of Dubai. In the 19th century, the Dubai and Abu Dhabi branches parted ways.

Into the mid-20th century, the economy of Abu Dhabi continued to be sustained mainly by camel herding, production of dates and vegetables at the inland oases of Al-Ain and Liwa, and fishing and pearl diving off the coast of Abu Dhabi city, which was occupied mainly during the summer months. Most dwellings in Abu Dhabi city were, at this time, constructed of palm fronds (barasti), with the wealthier families occupying mud huts. The growth of the cultured pearl industry in the first half of the twentieth century created hardship for residents of Abu Dhabi as pearls represented the largest export and main source of cash earnings.

In 1939, Sheikh Shakhbut Bin-Sultan Al Nahyan granted petroleum concessions, and oil was first found in 1958. At first, oil money had a marginal impact. A few low-rise concrete buildings were erected, and the first paved road was completed in 1961, but Sheikh Shakbut, uncertain whether the new oil royalties would last, took a cautious approach, preferring to save the revenue rather than investing it in development.

His brother, Sheikh Zayed bin Sultan Al Nahyan, saw that oil wealth had the potential to transform Abu Dhabi. The ruling Nahyan family decided that Sheikh Zayed should replace his brother as ruler and carry out his vision of developing the country. On August 6, 1966, with the assistance of the British, Zayed became the new ruler.

With the announcement by the UK in 1968 that it would withdraw from the area of the Persian Gulf by 1971, Sheikh Zayed became the main driving force behind the formation of the UAE. After the Emirates gained independence in 1971, oil wealth continued to flow to the area, and traditional mud-brick huts were rapidly replaced with banks, boutiques and modern highrises.

Geography

The United Arab Emirates is located in the oil-rich and strategic Arabian or Persian Gulf region. It adjoins the Kingdom of Saudi Arabia and the Sultanate of Oman.

Abu Dhabi is located in the far west and southwest part of the United Arab Emirates along the southern coast of the Persian Gulf between latitudes 22°40' and around 25° north and longitudes 51° and around 56° east. It borders the emirate of Dubai and emirate of Sharjah to its north.

The territorial waters of the Emirate embrace about 200 islands off its  coastline. The topography of the Emirate is dominated by low-lying sandy terrain dotted with sand dunes exceeding  in height in some areas southwards. The eastern part of the Emirate borders the western fringes of the Hajar Mountains. Hafeet Mountain, Abu Dhabi's highest elevation and sole mountain, rising , is located south of Al-Ain City.

Land cultivation and irrigation for agriculture and forestation over the past decade has increased the size of "green" areas in the emirate to about 5% of the total land area, including parks and roadside plantations. About 1.2% of the total land area is used for agriculture. A small part of the land area is covered by mountains, containing several caves. The coastal area contains pockets of wetland and mangrove colonies. Abu Dhabi also has dozens of islands, mostly small and uninhabited, some of which have been designated as sanctuaries for wildlife.

Climate

The emirate is located in the tropical dry region. The Tropic of Cancer runs through the southern part of the Emirate, giving its climate an arid nature characterised by high temperatures throughout the year, and a very hot summer. The Emirate's high summer (June to August) temperatures are associated with high relative humidity, especially in coastal areas. Abu Dhabi has warm winters with occasionally low temperatures. The air temperatures show variations between the coastal strip, the desert interior and areas of higher elevation, which together make up the topography of the Emirate.

Abu Dhabi receives scant rainfall but totals vary greatly from year to year. Seasonal northerly winds blow across the country, helping to ameliorate the weather, when they are not laden with dust, in addition to the brief moisture-laden south-easterly winds. The winds often vary between southerly, south-easterly, westerly, northerly and northwesterly. Another characteristic of the Emirate's weather is the high rate of evaporation of water due to several factors, namely high temperature, wind speed, and low rainfall.

Government

The emirate's political form is an absolutist, hereditary monarchy. The law is based mainly on the sharia. Head of state was HH Sheikh Khalifa bin Zayed Al Nahyan until 2022. He was a son of Sheikh Zayed bin Sultan Al Nahyan, the first president of the United Arab Emirates. The Qasr al-Hosn was the palace-fort and seat of government of the rulers of Abu Dhabi from ca. 1760/1790 to 1966.

Emir Mohamed bin Zayed Al Nahyan (formerly the crown prince) wields considerable influence as head of the Executive Council and as deputy supreme commander of the armed forces of the federation. The executive council is the government of the emirate. The crown prince is assisted in his duties by the Crown Prince's Court, or Diwan. The total number of members of the Executive Council has been slimmed down to 98 since the succession and it now consists largely of prominent members of the ruling family as well as a number of respected politicians.

Under the executive council are various separate departments, which operate as ministries, such as the Education Council, Urban Planning Council, and the Regulation and Supervision Bureau. There are also a number of autonomous agencies, such as the environmental agency, Abu Dhabi Tourism Authority, authority for culture and heritage, and the health authority. Abu Dhabi Police is the primary law enforcement agency.

On the federal level, all emirates maintain their hereditary rulers who, as a group, form the Federal Supreme Council of Rulers, headed by the president. Although the presidency is renewable every five years through a vote in the council, Sheikh Zayed bin Sultan Al Nahyan held the presidency from the formation of the UAE until his death in November 2004, and there is an implicit understanding that Abu Dhabi's ruler will always be elected president.

Although no elected parliament exists, the traditional majlis is a form of popular consultation and political participation. The open assembly is held by the emir and members of the royal family, in which any citizen has the right to come and voice their concerns openly.

On the municipal level, each one has their local government under the umbrella of the Department of Municipal Affairs such as Abu Dhabi capital district, the Western Region Municipality, and the Eastern Region Municipality. State finances are mainly through the sale of oil. Any excess reserves are managed by the Abu Dhabi Investment Authority, which invests the money into various government projects.

Demographics

The extraordinary increase in population in the Emirate of Abu Dhabi during the past half-century has made the size, structure and distribution of the population a key concern for future development.

The population of Abu Dhabi reached 1.968 million in mid-2010, with an average annual growth rate of 9.6% since 1960 - among the highest in the world. The total population has increased 99 times in 50 years. The number of citizens increased 39 times and Non-citizens 173 times in the half-century from 1960 to 2010. The most important reason behind the increase in the population growth of citizens is the increase in naturalization (before 1971, and later from other UAE emirates), while immigration constitutes the main factor in increasing the population overall.

The resident population of the Abu Dhabi Emirate exceeded 2 million people in 2011. In mid-year 2011 the estimated population in Abu Dhabi Region was 1.31 million (61.8%), Al Ain Region 0.58 million (27.6%), and Al Gharbia 0.23 million (10.6%), making the total mid-year population for the Abu Dhabi Emirate 2.12 million.

In Abu Dhabi, fertility is higher than in most developed regions of the world, and mortality remains extremely low. In 2011, Crude Birth Rates and Crude Death Rates among Citizens were 15.1 births per 1,000 people and 1.4 deaths per 1,000 people respectively.

Economy

Abu Dhabi GDP estimates in 2011 amounted to AED 806,031 million at current prices, compared with AED 620,316 million at current prices in 2010. This represents an annual growth rate of 29.9 per cent in 2011. Accordingly, the annual per capita gross domestic product amounted to AED 380.1 thousand in 2011. The total fixed capital formation was AED 199,001 million in 2011, while the compensation of employees amounted to AED 124,960 million in the same year. The main activities contributing to economic growth (GDP at constant prices) in 2011 were "Mining and quarrying" (including crude oil and natural gas), "Financial and insurance" and "Manufacturing" with increases of 9.4 per cent, 10.5 per cent and 9.8 per cent respectively. Commodity imports through the ports of the Emirate of Abu Dhabi were valued at AED 116.4 billion in 2011 compared with AED 86.6 billion in 2010. The main imports during 2011 were machinery and base metals, which accounted for 50.7 per cent of the total value of imports. The United States of America was the main country for imports, from which the Emirate received imports worth AED 13.4 billion. Non-oil exports were valued at AED 11.5 billion, with transport equipment and base metals contributing 61.5 per cent of the total. Canada was the top destination of Abu Dhabi non-oil exports, receiving goods worth AED 2.6 billion from the Emirate in 2011. Mina' Zayid is the main port of Abu Dhabi through which the goods flow.

Al-Ain has one of the few remaining traditional camels souqs in the country, near an IKEA store.

The Emirate exported 747.2 million barrels of crude oil in 2010. Japan, the top importer, received around 35.6 per cent of the Emirate's total crude oil exports. In 2011, the Emirate exported 10.0 million metric tons of refined petroleum products, of which the Netherlands bought 16.9 per cent, followed by Japan, which purchased 13.9 per cent. One of the main oil pipelines is the Habshan–Fujairah oil pipeline. The Emirate's LNG exports increased by AED 2,973.0 million in 2011 compared with 2010, reaching AED 17,128.2 million. Japan topped the list of importers by 98.4 per cent of the LNG exports value, followed by India by 1.0 per cent in 2011. The Emirate imported 828,093.9 million cubic feet of natural gas in 2011, at a daily average of 2,268.8 million cubic feet.

The inflation rate in 2011 was 1.9 per cent. This was a result of an increase in the CPI from 119.3 points in 2010 to 121.6 points in 2011.

The National Bank of Abu Dhabi (NBAD) is the largest lender bank in the emirate and the second-largest lender in the federation. NBAD has the largest market capitalization among UAE banks. The government has put in efforts to diversify the economy and invest in other areas such as the service and tourism industry. The capital city has seen various construction projects and the opening of shopping malls. The opening of the Emirates Palace marked the opening of the most expensive hotel ever built. The annual Abu Dhabi Grand Prix is a Formula One motor race held in the capital city, which further attracts tourists. Apart from the capital city, the Abu Dhabi Desert Challenge is held in the countryside and the tourism board is trying to highlight other places in the emirate.

The Emirate encourages major international film productions which boost employment and the economy in general. A 2019 report stated that the Film Commission provides "30% cashback on production and post-production spend in the Emirate". As a result, films such as shot many scenes in Abu Dhabi and in nearby areas, including Mission: Impossible – Fallout, War Machine, and in 2018, 6 Underground. For the filming of the latter movie, the UAE military worked with the crew, providing soldiers as extras as well as aircraft that appear in the film. Production designer Jeffrey Beecroft made this comment: "I’ve shot a lot of military stuff with Michael, but I never had the ability to have six Apache [helicopters], 10 Black Hawks and soldiers".

Sub-divisions and settlements

The Emirate is divided into three municipal regions. The capital city Abu Dhabi has seen new construction of modern high rises, tall office and apartment buildings, and busy shops. Other urban centres in the emirate are Al-Ain, Baniyas and Ruwais. Al-Ain is an agglomeration of several villages scattered around a desert oasis; today it is the site of the national university, UAEU. In addition, Al-Ain is billed as the "Garden City" of the UAE.

...
Al Ajban
Al Tawelah
Al Shalelah
Al Shamkha
Al Wahda
Al Mu'azaz
Al Ad'la
Marabe al Dhafra

Transport

Abu Dhabi International Airport (AUH) and Al Ain International Airport (AAN) serve the emirate. The older AUH airport was at Al Bateen Airport. The local time is GMT + 4 hours. Private vehicles, rideshares and taxis are the primary means of transportation in the city, although public buses, run by the Abu Dhabi Municipality, are available, mostly used by the lower-income population. There are bus routes to nearby towns such as Baniyas, Habashan and the garden city of the UAE, Al-Ain, among others. The government is planning to build a railway in Abu Dhabi.

There are many ports in Abu Dhabi. Khalifa Port is the most recent one.

Education
All private and public schools in the emirate come under the authority of the Abu Dhabi Education Council, while other emirates continue to work under the Federal Ministry of Education. 

Schools and universities in Abu Dhabi:
 AAESS
 Sheikh Khalifa Bin Zayed Arab Pakistani School (Kindergarten through 12th-grade FSC)
 Pakistan Community Welfare School 
 Abu Dhabi Indian School
 Abu Dhabi Indian School Branch 1, Al Wathba
 Abu Dhabi International School
 Abu Dhabi Men's College (a campus of The Higher Colleges of Technology)
 Abu Dhabi University
 Abu Dhabi Women's College (a campus of The Higher Colleges of Technology)
 Al Bateen Secondary School (British Curriculum)
 The American Community School of Abu Dhabi
 The American International School in Abu Dhabi
 Bright Kids Nursery, Muroor Street
 Emirates College for Advanced Education (ECAE) 
 Emirates Future International Academy
 INSEAD Centre in Abu Dhabi
 International School of Choueifat, Abu Dhabi
 Islamia English School (Kindergarten through 12th-grade FSC, IGCSE: O Levels and A Levels also offered)
 Jarn Yafoor Middle School
 Khalifa University of Science, Technology and Research (KUSTAR)
 Masdar Institute of Science and Technology (research-oriented graduate-level university)
 Merryland International, Musaffah
 New York Institute of Technology
 New York University Abu Dhabi
 Paris-Sorbonne University Abu Dhabi
 Shaikh Khalifa Bin Zayed Bangladesh Islamia School
 Sherwood Academy CBSE
 Sherwood Academy IGCSC
 The British School
 The Petroleum Institute
 Zayed University
 Abu Dhabi Grammar School (Canada)
 Al Mushrif
 Al Nahda National Schools (Boys' and Girls' school O Levels, A-Levels, American High school system)
 Al Yasmina School
 Al-Noor Indian Islamic School
 Al Manhal International Private School
 Al Ma'ali International School
 Ashbal Al Quds Private School
 Emirates National School
 First Steps School Nursery
 GEMS American Academy
 Indian Islahi Islamic School
 International Community School
 Khawarizmi International College
 Our Own English High School
 St.Joseph's School
 Strathclyde Business School (MSc/MBA)
 The British School – Al Khubairat
 The Cambridge High School
 The Elite Private School
 The Glenelg School of Abu Dhabi
 The Philippine School, Abu Dhabi

See also
 Mussafah Bridge
 Mussafah Port
 Postage stamps of Abu Dhabi
 Water supply and sanitation in Abu Dhabi
 Wildlife of the United Arab Emirates

References

External links

 Abu Dhabi Police
 Abu Dhabi Chamber of Commerce and Industry
 Universities in Abu Dhabi
 Snow Abu Dhabi

Newspapers
 Gulf News
 Khaleej Times
 Emirates Today
 7 Days
 Emirates Evening Post
 The National

 
Populated coastal places in the United Arab Emirates
Islamic monarchies